The Gold Coast Rugby League (also known as the Kevin Bycroft Cup) is a rugby league football competition based in Gold Coast, Queensland, Australia. It is under the administration of the Queensland Rugby League through the South East Queensland Division, which also administers the Brisbane and Ipswich competitions.

The Gold Coast Rugby League Premiership consists of ten clubs, competing in three senior leagues; A-Grade, Reserves and Colts (under-19s). The Gold Coast Junior Rugby League was formed in 1976 and consists of seventeen clubs, competing in multiple age groups from under-7s to under-17s.

Representative team 

Selected players from the Gold Coast Rugby League, represented Gold Coast in a representative side called Combined Gold Coast, also called Gold Coast Vikings, whose teams compete in the statewide competitions, the Cyril Connell Cup and the Mal Meninga Cup.

The Gold Coast Rugby League has previously entered sides in the Queensland Cup and in the Winfield State League as the Vikings. They participated in the Queensland Cup in 1998 only and in the Winfield State League from the first season (1982) to the last season (1995). Gold Coast also made one appearance in the Amco Cup.

Premiership winners
Grand Final results compiled from scores published in the Rugby League Week.

Gold Coast Rugby League Club Teams
The Gold Coast Rugby League Premiership currently has 18 clubs, for senior and junior. All clubs are in the junior division but not all for the senior division.

See also

Rugby League Competitions in Australia

References

External links

 

Rugby league competitions in Queensland
Rugby league on the Gold Coast, Queensland
Recurring sporting events established in 1983
1983 establishments in Australia
Sports leagues established in 1983
Queensland Rugby League